Steve or Stephen Badger may refer to:

 Steve Badger (poker player), former professional poker player
 Steve Badger (swimmer) (born 1956), Australian and later Canadian former swimmer
 Stephen M. Badger (born 1968), American heir, businessman and documentary producer